The following outline is provided as an overview of and topical guide to Yukon.

Yukon is the westernmost and smallest of Canada's three federal territories.  Whitehorse is the territorial capital.  The Territory was named after the Yukon River. The word Yukon means "Great River" or "Big Stream" in Gwich'in.

Geography of Yukon

Geography of Yukon
 Yukon is: a territory of Canada
 Location:
 The regions in which Yukon is located are:
 Northern Hemisphere, Western Hemisphere
 Americas
 North America
 Northern America
 Canada
 Western Canada
 Extreme points of Yukon
 Population of Yukon:
 Area of Yukon:
 Atlas of Yukon

Environment of Yukon 

 Protected areas of Yukon
 Historic places in Yukon
 Ghost towns in Yukon
 National Historic Sites of Canada in Yukon
 National Register of Historic Places listings in Yukon-Charley Rivers National Preserve
 National Register of Historic Places listings in Yukon–Koyukuk Census Area, Alaska

Natural geographic features of Yukon 
 Lakes in Yukon
 Rivers in Yukon

Regions of Yukon 
 Communities in Yukon
 Municipalities in Yukon

Demographics of Yukon 
 Demographics of Yukon

Government and politics of Yukon
 Elections of Yukon
 General elections of Yukon
 By-elections of Yukon
 Political parties in Yukon

Government of Yukon

Executive branch of the government of Yukon 
 Premier of Yukon
 Premiers of Yukon
 Commissioner of Yukon
 Order of precedence in Yukon
 Executive Council of Yukon (Cabinet)

Legislative branch of the government of Yukon 
 Yukon Legislative Assembly
 Leaders of Opposition of Yukon
 32nd Legislature of Yukon
 33rd Legislature of Yukon

Judicial branch of the government of Yukon 
 Territorial Court of Yukon
 Supreme Court of Yukon

Law of Yukon 
 Same-sex marriage in Yukon

History of Yukon
 History of Yukon

Culture of Yukon

 Museums in Yukon
 Music of Yukon
 People of Yukon
 Yukoners
 Religion in Yukon
 Christianity in Yukon
 Diocese of Yukon
 Prefecture Apostolic of Yukon
 Scouting and Guiding in Yukon
 Symbols of Yukon
 Coat of arms of Yukon
 Flag of Yukon

Economy and infrastructure of Yukon

 Communication in Yukon
 Radio stations in Yukon
 Television transmitters in Yukon
 Energy in Yukon
 Electricity generating stations in Yukon
 Mining in Yukon
 Faro
 Kudz Ze Kayah mine
 Transport in Yukon
 Air transport in Yukon
 Airlines of Yukon
 Airports in Yukon
 Vehicular transport in Yukon
 Vehicle registration plates of Yukon
 Road system in Yukon
 Territorial highways of Yukon

Education in Yukon

 List of schools in Yukon
 Museums in Yukon
 Higher education in Yukon

See also

 Yukon NDP members
 Yukon Quest competitors

References

External links

 Yukon Government
 
 Yukon Attraction & Service Guides
 Immigration Yukon
 University of Washington Libraries: Digital Collections:
 CBC Digital Archives - Territorial Battles: Yukon Elections, 1978-2002

Yukon
Yukon
 1